Bel-Red is an industrial neighborhood of Bellevue, Washington, located in the northeastern portion of the city.

History
Bel-Red was developed in the 1960s for warehouses and manufacturing facilities, and was named for its location between the cities of Bellevue and Redmond.

The area was re-zoned to support non-industrial uses in 2009, paving the way for the development of the Spring District, a mixed-use district in the western Bel-Red area.

Transportation

Bel-Red is served by Bel-Red Road, which runs diagonally through the neighborhood. State Route 520 passes to the north of the neighborhood.

In 2023, Sound Transit will open its East Link light rail line, with two stops in Bel-Red: Spring District/120th and Bel-Red/130th.

References

External links

Neighborhoods in Bellevue, Washington